The Bill Dana Show was an American comedy series starring Bill Dana and Jonathan Harris that aired on NBC from September 22, 1963 to January 17, 1965. The plot follows the daily lifestyle of Latin American José Jiménez, as a bellhop in a New York City hotel.

The series was a spin-off from Make Room for Daddy, which showed the character of José as an elevator operator before he became a bellhop.

Synopsis
The hotel was practically José's entire world; he lived in special bachelor headquarters provided for hotel employees, ate in the hotel kitchen, and had social contact only with employees and guests of the hotel. In his goodhearted naivete, he saw only the good in the people around him. His biggest problems were his fellow bellhop Eddie (Gary Crosby), who was constantly trying to get José to wise up; the less-than-understanding hotel manager Mr. Phillips (Jonathan Harris, who would soon play Dr. Smith on Lost in Space) and the bumbling hotel detective Byron Glick (Don Adams, in a predecessor to the character he would play on Get Smart). In the second season, Maggie Peterson played Susie, a waitress in the hotel's coffee shop.

Walter Mitty-like dream sequences were occasionally used to extricate José from the hotel environment.

Dana did a cameo as José Jiménez on an episode of Batman. He introduces himself to Batman and Robin by saying "My name- José Jiménez". This episode was titled "The Yegg Foes in Gotham" and originally aired on ABC on October 20, 1966. It was the last time Dana played José Jiménez.

Series run
The series, sponsored by Procter & Gamble, premiered on September 22, 1963 and ran for a season-and-a-half, before its run ended on January 17, 1965 (the following week, it was replaced by Branded).

Awards 
The Bill Dana Show received an Emmy Award nomination for Outstanding Achievement in the Field of Comedy at the 16th Primetime Emmy Awards in 1964.

Episode list

Season 1 (1963–64)

Season 2 (1964-65)

See also 
 16th Primetime Emmy Awards

References

External links

 

1960s American sitcoms
1963 American television series debuts
1965 American television series endings
1960s American workplace comedy television series
American television spin-offs
Black-and-white American television shows
English-language television shows
NBC original programming
Television series set in hotels
Television shows set in New York City